Vladimir Vitalyevich Suleimanov (born 21 January 1985) is a former Russian professional footballer.

Club career
Suleimanov played for FC Dinamo Minsk of Belarus against the Estonian club Levadia Tallinn in the group stage of the Commonwealth of Independent States Cup in 2005.

Honours
 Belarusian Premier League champion: 2004.

References

External links
 
 

1985 births
Living people
Russian footballers
Association football goalkeepers
FC Zenit Saint Petersburg players
FC Vityaz Podolsk players
FC Dinamo Minsk players
FC Vostok players
FC Khimki players
FC Rubin Kazan players
FC Sever Murmansk players
Belarusian Premier League players
Kazakhstan Premier League players
Russian expatriate footballers
Expatriate footballers in Belarus
Expatriate footballers in Kazakhstan
Russian expatriate sportspeople in Kazakhstan
Russian expatriate sportspeople in Belarus